Angeles station is a former railway station located on the North Main Line in Pampanga, Philippines. It is currently being rebuilt as part of the second phase of the North–South Commuter Railway.

History
The station has been used for passenger and freight transportation notably by Manila Railroad Company and the Philippine National Railways (PNR).

In April 1942, during World War II, local residents threw food and drinks into wagons filled with US and Filipino soldiers being transported by the Japanese Imperial Army.

The station ceased to operate after the North Main Line was closed in 1988. Since then, the local government has converted the area into a park.

The station was to be rebuilt as a part of the Northrail project, which involved the upgrading of the existing single track to an elevated dual-track system, converting the rail gauge from narrow gauge to standard gauge, and linking Manila to Malolos in Bulacan and further on to Angeles City, Clark Special Economic Zone and Clark International Airport. The project commenced in 2007, but was repeatedly halted then discontinued in 2011.

References

Philippine National Railways stations
Railway stations in Pampanga
Proposed railway stations in the Philippines